Emmanuel College is a constituent college of the University of Cambridge. The college was founded in 1584 by Sir Walter Mildmay, Chancellor of the Exchequer to Elizabeth I. The site on which the college sits was once a priory for Dominican monks, and the College Hall is built on the foundations of the monastery's nave. Emmanuel is one of the 16 "old colleges", which were founded before the 17th century.

Emmanuel today is one of the larger Cambridge colleges; it has around 500 undergraduates, reading almost every subject taught within the University, and over 150 postgraduates. Among Emmanuel's notable alumni are Thomas Young, John Harvard, Graham Chapman and Sebastian Faulks. Three members of Emmanuel College have received Nobel Prizes: Ronald Norrish, George Porter (both Chemistry, 1967) and Frederick Hopkins (Medicine, 1929).

In every year from 1998 until 2016, Emmanuel was among the top five colleges in the Tompkins Table, which ranks colleges according to end-of-year examination results. Emmanuel topped the table five times (2003, 2004, 2006, 2007 and 2010) and placed second six times (2001, 2002, 2008, 2009, 2011 and 2012). Its mean score for 1997–2018 inclusive places it as the second-highest-ranking college after Trinity.

History

The college was founded in 1584 by Sir Walter Mildmay, Chancellor of the Exchequer to Elizabeth I. The site had been occupied by a Dominican friary until the Dissolution of the Monasteries 45 years earlier, after which the Vice-Chancellor petitioned that the place be given over to the University. His request was refused, and, after passing through several hands, the former monastery was purchased to be the site of the new College in June 1583 by Lawrence Chaderton, the Master-elect, and his brother-in-law, Richard Culverwell, for £550, acting on behalf of Mildmay, to whom they conveyed the place on 23 November 1582. Mildmay's foundation made use of the existing buildings. The architect was Ralph Symons, and in 1588 the new building was opened with a dedication festival, which Mildmay attended.

Mildmay, a Puritan, intended Emmanuel to be a centre for the training of Anglican preachers. According to Thomas Fuller, Mildmay, on coming to court after the college was opened, was addressed by the Queen with the words: "Sir Walter, I hear you have erected a puritan foundation", to which Mildmay replied: "No, madam; far be it from me to countenance anything contrary to your established laws; but I have set an acorn, which when it becomes an oak, God alone knows what will be the fruit thereof".

Like all the older Cambridge colleges, Emmanuel originally took only male students. It first admitted female students in 1979.

Buildings and grounds
Under Mildmay's instructions the chapel of the original Dominican Friary was converted into the College's dining hall and the friars' dining hall became a chapel. In the late 17th century the College commissioned a new chapel, one of the three buildings in Cambridge designed by Christopher Wren (1677). After Wren's construction was opened the old chapel became the College library until it outgrew the space. A purpose-built library was completed in 1930.

There is a large fish pond in the grounds, part of the legacy of the friary. The pond is home to a colony of ducks.

The Fellows' Garden contains a swimming pool that was originally the friars' bathing pool, making it one of the oldest bathing pools in Europe and allegedly the oldest outdoor pool in continuous use in the UK. The Garden also contains an Oriental plane tree that is reputed to have lived far longer than is typical for the species.

It has been claimed that the college has the only privately owned subway (underpass) in the UK, connecting the main site to North Court, but in fact Oriel College, Oxford, has its own tunnel beneath Oriel Street linking the Island Site with the main college buildings. The Bodleian Library in Oxford also has its own tunnel beneath Broad Street.

Student life

The Emmanuel College Students Union (ECSU) is the society of all undergraduate students at Emmanuel College. It provides a shop, a bar, a common room, and funding for sports and other societies. ECSU's Executive Committee is elected at the end of Michaelmas Term each year. The ECSU committee is staffed by undergraduates and holds such positions as President, Welfare Officer, and Ents Officer amongst others.

The Emmanuel College Middle Combination Room (Emma MCR) is the society of all postgraduate students at Emmanuel College. The Room itself is a comfortable and well-equipped space in the Queen's Building. The MCR committee organises regular social events for graduate students, including well-attended formal dinners in hall every few weeks.

Sports and societies
There are numerous student societies and sports clubs at Emmanuel College. Sports clubs include tennis, badminton, cricket, squash, rugby, football, hockey and netball. Societies include the Emmanuel College Music Society (ECMS), the Christian Union, the Mountaineering Club, the recently relaunched Emmanuel College Art and Photography Society, the Emmanuel Vegan Society, the Politics and Economics Society, ROAR (the college satirical newspaper) and the Emma A soc. Funding for societies, old and new, comes from the Emmanuel College Students Union (ECSU).

People associated with Emmanuel

Former students

Emmanuel graduates were prominently involved in the settling of British colonies in North America. Of the first 100 university graduates in New England, one third were graduates of Emmanuel. Harvard University, the first college in the United States, was organised on the model of Emmanuel as it was then run. Harvard is named for John Harvard (BA, 1632), an Emmanuel graduate. Emmanuel and Harvard maintain relations via student exchanges such as the Herchel Smith scholarships, the Harvard Scholarship, the Paul Williams Scholarship, and the Gomes lecture and dinner held each February at Emmanuel in honour of the late Peter Gomes, erstwhile minister at Harvard's Memorial Church.

Early Emmanuel graduates included several translators of the 1611 Authorised Version of the Bible, for example Laurence Chaderton and William Branthwaite.

Fictional characters who have been said to have gone to Emmanuel include Jonathan Swift's Lemuel Gulliver. It is implied that Sebastian Faulks's eponymous Engleby and Thomas Richardson also matriculated at Emmanuel. The protagonist in Samuel Butler's novel The Way of All Flesh also went to Emmanuel. The uncompleted Doctor Who serial Shada was also partly filmed in the college, with the character Professor Chronotis having rooms in New Court.

Miscellaneous

College grace

See also
 List of Organ Scholars
 List of Masters of Emmanuel College

References

External links

 Emmanuel College website
 Emmanuel College May Ball website
 Emmanuel College Middle Combination Room (MCR)
 Emmanuel College Students' Union

 
1584 establishments in England
Educational institutions established in the 1580s
Colleges of the University of Cambridge
Christopher Wren buildings
Grade I listed buildings in Cambridge
Grade I listed educational buildings
Grade II* listed parks and gardens in Cambridgeshire